Ballyclare Junction railway station was on the Belfast and Ballymena Railway which ran from Belfast to Ballymena in Northern Ireland.
Despite the name, the physical junction for the branch line to Ballyclare was located a short distance along the line in the Antrim direction, at Kingsbog Junction.

History

The station was opened as Ballynure Road by the Belfast and Ballymena Railway on 1 February 1849. It was renamed Ballynure Junction on 3 November 1884.

The station closed to passengers on 4 December 1961.

References 

Disused railway stations in County Antrim
Railway stations opened in 1849
Railway stations closed in 1961
1849 establishments in Ireland

Railway stations in Northern Ireland opened in 1849